The Killing Kind is an upcoming British legal thriller television series based on the novel of the same name by Jane Casey, adapted by Jonathan H. A. Stewart and Zara Hayes and developed by Eleventh Hour Films for Paramount+.

Synopsis
Ingrid (Appleton) is a barrister trying to rebuild her life after getting too close to a dangerous former client (Morgan), when suddenly he reappears in her life.

Cast
 Colin Morgan as John Webster
 Emma Appleton as Ingrid Lewis
 Elliot Barnes-Worrell as Mark Orpen
 Rob Jarvis
 Kerr Logan as Luke Nash
 Nicholas Rowe as Angus Grey  
 Sara Powell as Belinda Grey
 Niamh Gaia as Flora Pole

Production
Eleventh Hour Films optioned the rights to adapt Jane Casey's book The Killing Kind in May 2021, the same month the book was released. It was announced in December 2022 that Paramount+ had greenlit the six-part adaptation of Casey's novel with Sony Pictures Television attached as a distributor. Casey was to be involved in the adaptation with Eleventh Hour Films, director Zara Hayes and co-screenplay writer Jonathan A.H. Stewart. Casey herself would executive produce the series with Paula Cuddy, Jill Green and Eva Gutierrez, with Andy Litvin as producer.

Casting
The cast were announced at the end of January 2023, with Colin Morgan and Emma Appleton set to lead the series. Also joining the cast were Elliot Barnes-Worrell, Rob Jarvis, and Kerr Logan.

Filming
Principal photography began at The Bottle Yard Studios in Bristol and on location in and around Bristol, with filming locations including the College Green, Avon Street, and outside Bristol Cathedral. Filming also took place in Kingsdown and Bedminster, Bristol. In February 2023, location shooting took place on the seafront at Brean in Somerset. Filming also taking place in March in and around the Westgate Hotel in Newport. Filming is also scheduled for London.

Broadcast
It is expected to stream on Paramount+ in 2024.

References

External links
 

2020s British drama television series
2020s British television miniseries
Upcoming drama television series
English-language television shows
Television shows shot in Bristol
British thriller television series